Sovetskaya Derevnya is a rural locality (a khutor) in Plotavsky Selsoviet Rural Settlement, Oktyabrsky District, Kursk Oblast, Russia. Population:

Geography 
The khutor is located 59 km from the Russia–Ukraine border, 29 km south-west of Kursk, 13 km south-west of the district center – the urban-type settlement Pryamitsyno, 8 km from the selsoviet center – Plotava.

 Climate
Sovetskaya Derevnya has a warm-summer humid continental climate (Dfb in the Köppen climate classification).

Transport 
Sovetskaya Derevnya is located 17.5 km from the federal route  Crimea Highway (a part of the European route ), 1.5 km from the road of regional importance  (Dyakonovo – Sudzha – border with Ukraine), 1 km from the road  ("Crimea Highway" – Ivanino, part of the European route ), 9 km from the nearest railway halt 439 km (railway line Lgov I — Kursk).

The rural locality is situated 40 km from Kursk Vostochny Airport, 114 km from Belgorod International Airport and 239 km from Voronezh Peter the Great Airport.

References

Notes

Sources

Rural localities in Oktyabrsky District, Kursk Oblast